Samuel Alexander Kirk (1904–1996) was an American psychologist and educator, who is best known for coining the term learning disability.

Early life 

Kirk was born in Rugby, North Dakota on 1 September 1904, to the farmers Richard and Nellie Kirk. He grew up on in a farm town and taught farmhands how to read at night. Kirk served in the military where he created a program for recruits who struggled with reading and writing.

Kirk received both his bachelor's and master's degree in psychology from the University of Chicago. He then obtained his PhD in physiological and clinical psychology from the University of Michigan.

He married Winifred D. Kirk and had one son, Jerry Kirk, and one daughter, anthropologist Lorraine Kirk.

Career 

Samuel Kirk is recognized for his accomplishments in the field of special education, while sometimes being referred to as the “Father of Special Education”.

He began his teaching career at the Oaks School in Chicago in 1929, where he worked specifically with boys who were delinquent and had mental disabilities. His interest in the field of special education continued as he worked closely with individuals with learning disabilities. Samuel Kirk “wrote so widely and so authoritatively on so many aspects of mental retardation and learning disorders and was responsible for so many innovations in diagnosis, training, and social policy”.

In 1963, Kirk delivered a speech to an education conference and was the first to use and define the term “learning disability”. This speech had a monumental effect on social policies and also helped name Kirk to the federal post by John F. Kennedy who had a sister who had a mental disability (now more commonly called an intellectual disability). Kirk laid the groundwork for passing laws, which required schools to provide help for children with learning disabilities. In public policy (1964), Kirk persuaded Washington to provide money in order to train teachers to help students with learning disabilities. Kirk's commitment to students with learning disabilities led to the first ever Institute for Research on Exceptional Children more than 50 years ago, which is still a popular foundation in the special education department.

Within Kirk's publications regarding learning disabilities, he describes classifications used for children with learning disabilities. This includes a unified classification of children with low intelligence, while they are differentiated based on a degree of learning deficit, for educational purposes. He also listed the causes he discovered to be associated with learning disabilities. These are as follows: brain injuries, physiological disturbances, hereditary factors, and cultural factors. Within his publication titled Educating the Retarded Child, he describes the identification for a child with a learning disability to include a study of the child across disciplines, or as a whole, intelligence tests, achievement tests, and personality and social maturity tests.

Publications

References 

20th-century American psychologists
University of Michigan alumni
University of Chicago alumni
1904 births
1996 deaths
People from Rugby, North Dakota
University of Arizona faculty
Special education in the United States